Oswald Martin Watts, FRAS, FIN (18 March 1901 – 1 November 1985) was a master mariner and nautical author who founded the ship chandlers and yacht brokerage Captain O. M. Watts.

Early life and family
Oswald Watts was born in Streatham on 18 March 1901 to Alfred Ernest Watts, a chartered accountant, and his wife Lilian.

Career

Watts was a master mariner and nautical author who founded the ship chandlers and yacht brokerage Captain O. M. Watts. During the Second World War and before Watts trained a large number of sailors to their then Yacht Master's (Coastal) certificate. He was also a yacht designer.<ref>{{cite web |authorlink1=Enter 'Watts in the search box |title=Yacht designs database |url=http://nationalmaritimemuseumcornwall.com/iframe/yachtdesigns.php?yachtdesigns=y&mode=boat_name&letter=A&current_num=150&sort=b |website=National Maritime Museum - Yacht designs database |publisher=National Maritime Museum |accessdate=4 October 2020}}</ref>

Personal life and death
Watts lived in Norbury, London, SW16 and died on 1 November 1985. He was married and had a daughter.

Watts was commodore of the City Livery Yacht Club from 1966 to 1980.

Selected publications
 Lockwood's Manuals. Ship Stability & Trim Made Easy Including The Construction And Use Of Tipping . Scale And Slip Table, Etc. Published 1 January 1926 by Crosby Lockwood & Son
 The Sextant Simplified A Practical Explanation of the Use of the Sextant at Sea, Published 1 January 1973 by Thomas Reed Publications
 Coastal & Ocean Seamanship, (Ed.) Thomas Reed Publications, 1971 
 Log Book for Yachts (Ed.) 
 Practical Shipmasters' Business, Published 1 January 1927 by Imray
 Hints to Up-to-date Navigators, published 1 January 1927 by Crosby Lockwood

As editorReed's Nautical Almanac''

References

External links 
 Entry at FamilySearch.org 

1901 births
1985 deaths
British non-fiction writers
People from Streatham
20th-century non-fiction writers
British yacht designers
20th-century English businesspeople